Ocean is the second studio album by Colombian singer Karol G. It was released on May 3, 2019 by Universal Music Latin Entertainment. The production on the album was handled by multiple producers including Ovy on the Drums, DJ Luian, Mauricio Rengifo, Sky Rompiendo, Andy Clay and Andrés Torres. The album also featured guest appearances by Anuel AA, J Balvin, Maluma, Yandel, Damian Marley and Nicky Jam among others.

Ocean was preceded by five singles: "Pineapple", "Mi Cama", "Culpables", "Créeme" and "Punto G". The album received positive reviews from music critics and was a moderate commercial success. It debuted at number 54 on the US Billboard 200 and number two on both the US Top Latin Albums and US Latin Rhythm Albums charts, earning 12,000 album-equivalent units in its first week.

Critical reception

At Album of the Year, which assigns a normalized rating out of 100 to reviews from professional publications, the album received an average score of 70, based on two reviews. Elias Leight of Rolling Stone said, "The power of Ocean is somewhat diminished by the fact that a third of these songs are already out" but that "the remaining tracks are impressively varied: Piano balladry ('Ocean'), throwback hip-hop, which no one in the Latin mainstream is making ('Yo Aprendí'), guitar balladry ('Dices Que Te Vas', which tests her fiancée Anuel AA’s vocal limits) and a collaboration with the Brazilian duo Simone & Simaria... All the different styles mean that Ocean feels center-less, but that's kind of the point: If you hope to conquer the globe, you have to be all things to all people."

Commercial performance
Ocean debuted at number two on the US Top Latin Albums chart, earning 12,000 album-equivalent units (including 2,000 copies in pure album sales) in its first week. This became Karol G's second top-ten debut on the chart. The album also debuted at number 54 on the US Billboard 200 and number two on the US Latin Rhythm Albums charts respectively. In addition, the album accumulated a total of 10.9 million on-demand audio streams for its songs. On September 12, 2019, the album was certified five times platinum by the Latin Recording Industry Association of America (RIAA) for combined sales and album-equivalent units of over 300,000 units in the United States.

Track listing 
Credits were adapted from Genius.

Charts

Weekly charts

Year-end charts

Certifications

References

2019 albums
Karol G albums
Universal Music Latino albums
Albums produced by Ovy on the Drums